Hasanabad (also Romanized as Ḩasanābād; also known as Golzār (Persian: گلزار) and Golzār-e Kohneh) is a village in Gonbaki Rural District, Gonbaki District, Rigan County, Kerman Province, Iran. At the 2006 census, its population was 1,863, in 433 families.

References 

Populated places in Rigan County